Tanga-Pela is a village in the Sabce Department of Bam Province in northern-central Burkina Faso. It has a population of 341.

References

Populated places in the Centre-Nord Region
Bam Province